Naghan-e Sofla (also Romanized as Nāghān-e Soflá; also known as Nāghūn-e Pā’īn and Nāghūn Pā’īn) is a village in Milas Rural District, in the Central District of Lordegan County, Chaharmahal and Bakhtiari Province, Iran. At the 2006 census, its population was 1,486, in 285 families. The village is populated by Lurs.

References 

Populated places in Lordegan County
Luri settlements in Chaharmahal and Bakhtiari Province